Dublin Jerome High School is a public high school located in Dublin, Ohio, northwest of Columbus, Ohio. It is the newest of the three high schools in the Dublin City Schools district. Jerome opened for its first year during the 2004–2005 school year. Though located in the southeast tip of Union County, Dublin Jerome primarily serves students in parts of Franklin County and Delaware County. Jerome's mascot is the Celtic Warrior. Jerome was ranked number 143 in the Newsweek top high school rankings in 2013. In 2010 and 2021, Jerome was honored as a Blue Ribbon School by the US Department of Education.

Dublin Jerome is no longer an IB world school. Students wishing to participate in the IB program must go to Emerald Campus.

In 2020, U.S. News & World Report ranked Dublin Jerome as the #352 best public high school in the United States, and the #9 best public high school in Ohio.

It is also Dublin City Schools first school to open in Union County.

Music Programs

Marching Band 

The band was formed in 2004 when the school first opened. The Band has received a 'I' Superior rating at the Ohio Music Education Association (OMEA) state finals for its entire existence (2004–Present). Their highest score in OMEA competition is currently 281.45 scored during the 2019 season at Thomas Worthington High School. Their second highest score earned in 2018 was a 280.05! They have received this score at the Buckeye Invitational, hosted by the Ohio State University's marching band, in 2011, 2013, 2016, 2018.

Orchestra 
The Dublin Jerome Orchestra plays a combination of both classical and more modern music. It is conducted by Michelle Adair and has three concerts per year. The last concert of the year is the Concerto Concert in which three soloists perform, accompanied by a full orchestra. Pieces performed in the past have included Faure Elegie cello concerto, Bruch Violin Concerto, Sergei Rachmaninoff's 2nd Piano Concerto, Tchaikovsky's 1st Piano Concerto, and other well-known works.

Choir 
The Dublin Jerome Choir as a whole performs once at the yearly Holiday Showcase with the rest of the music department, and once again in the springtime for an original concert. Each time the choirs have gone to competitions (most notably, OMEA contests), they have received a "I" (superior) rating. The two higher choirs at Jerome, the chamber group A Capella and the all-girl group Chorale, were invited to perform in New York's Carnegie Hall in April 2010.

Theatre 
Dublin Jerome has had a Drama Club and a Theatre 3 Acting Ensemble since it first opened.

Seasons
2015-2016 Season: And Then There None, Cinderella, Student Directed One Acts, Sweeney Todd, Mystery at the Frisky Kitten

2016-2017 Season: A Flea In Her Ear, Charlotte's Web, Student Directed One Acts, Guys and Dolls, A Failure of Love Story

2017-2018 Season: The Octette Bridge Club, The Little Mermaid, Student Directed One Acts, Fame, Museum

2018-2019 Season: Almost Maine, Aladdin Jr., Student Directed One Acts, Into The Woods, A Little Overboard

2022-2023 Season: One Stoplight Town, Flat Stanley Jr., Student Directed One Acts, Shrek Jr., Peter and the Starcatcher

Awards

In 2019, Jerome's Production of Into the Woods brought in 13 nominations from the CAPA Marquee Awards. Three students took home awards. Maeve Gallagher won Best Leading Actress in a Musical. Grace Mayo and Caitlin O'Brien tied for the Outstanding Technical Achievement Award.

Athletics 

Dublin Jerome is an Ohio High School Athletic Association (OHSAA) Division I and Division II athletic high school. There are multiple sports teams for both men and women including football, soccer, cross country, field hockey, volleyball, wrestling, basketball, swimming, hockey, track, tennis, baseball, softball, golf and lacrosse.

Boys' lacrosse
The boys' lacrosse team won the Ohio High School Lacrosse Association Division IB state championship in 2005, and the Division II championship in 2010 and 2011. This title was not sponsored by the OHSAA until 2017.
They also won the 2021 Division I Lacrosse State Championship against Upper Arlington.

Girls' golf

The Celtic lady golfers won the OHSAA Division I State Championship in 2005, 2011, 2012, 2013, 2014, and 2015.

Boys' golf
Dublin Jerome won the state boys team golf tournament in 2004, 2005, 2007, 2011, 2012, 2013, 2017, 2018, and 2019. The 2004 title was in Division II and all others were in Division I.

Girls' tennis
Dublin Jerome won the state girls' tennis  doubles championship in 2004, 2007, 2011, and 2019 and the singles championship in 2006. The 2004 title was in Division II and all others were in Division I.

Notable alumni
 Connor Murphy - Professional Hockey player for the Chicago Blackhawks, First round draft pick by the Phoenix Coyotes.
 Cole Cassels - Professional Hockey player, drafted third round by the Vancouver Canucks.
 Chris Wood - Actor
J.C. Mack - Professional Soccer Player.
Lindsay Agnew - Professional Soccer Player.
Konrad Warzycha - Former Professional Soccer Player.

See also
 Dublin City School District

References

External links
 
 District Website

High schools in Union County, Ohio
Public high schools in Ohio
Dublin, Ohio